Thaler is a surname of Austrian (Tyrol, Wildschönau) origin. It may refer to:

Barbara Thaler (born 1982), an Austrian politician
Ben Thaler (born 1981), a professional rugby league referee
Bjorn Thaler, CFO of One Medical
 Erwin Thaler (1930–2001), an Austrian bobsledder
 Franz Thaler (1925–2015), Italian writer
 Helmut Thaler (born 1940), an Austrian luger
 Herbert Thaler (born 1940), an Austrian luger
 Johann Thaler (1920–1945), an Oberscharführer in the Waffen SS during World War II
 Josef Thaler, an Austrian luger
 Klaus-Peter Thaler (born 1949), a German professional cyclist
 Konrad Thaler (1940–2005), an Austrian arachnologist
 Mario Thaler (living), a German music producer
 Martin Thaler (living), an Austrian skeleton racer
 Patrick Thaler (born 1978), an Italian alpine skier
 Richard Thaler (born 1945), American economist and Nobel Laureate
 Robert Thaler (living), an American actor
 Ron Thaler, Canadian drummer and record producer
 Seymour R. Thaler (1919–1976), New York state senator
 William J. Thaler (1925–2005), an American experimental physicist
 Zoran Thaler (born 1962), a Slovenian politician and businessman

German-language surnames